The Independence Speed Tandem is a German single-place, paraglider that was designed by Michaël Nesler and produced by Independence Paragliding of Eisenberg, Thuringia. It is now out of production.

Design and development
The Speed Tandem was designed as a tandem glider for flight training.

The glider is DHV 1-2 certified.

Company test pilot Christian Amon was also involved in the development as well as flight testing of the Speed Tandem.

Specifications (Speed Tandem)

References

Speed Tandem
Paragliders